Eddie D. Wilcoxen (born 1949) served as the eighteenth poet laureate of the state of Oklahoma, appointed by Governor Brad Henry. Previous to his appointment, Wilcoxen was well known as a broadcaster with KWHW (AM) in Altus, Oklahoma. Wilcoxen's poetry is best classified as "folk" poetry, with an emphasis on rural life and traditions. Wilcoxen was also an accomplished karateka, training under the accomplished karateka and kickboxer, Joe Lewis. Wilcoxen then went on to create his own form of karate that he named Kihido Karate, kihido meaning "The Shining Spirit Way".

Oklahoma Proud!: A Centennial Book of Poems. Altus, OK: CTK Publishing, 2007.

Reflections of a Wandering Mind. Altus, OK: CTK Publishing, 2009.

Rose Petal Poems: Tales of Life and Love. Altus, OK: CTK Publishing, 2013.

See also 

 Poets Laureate of Oklahoma

References

1949 births
21st-century American poets
Poets Laureate of Oklahoma
Living people
American radio personalities